Kankan (also Romanized as Kankān; also known as Kahtekān and Kankār) is a village in Fedashkuyeh Rural District, Shibkaveh District, Fasa County, Fars Province, Iran. At the 2006 census, its population was 526, in 141 families.

References 

Populated places in Fasa County